Kotli Lions is a franchise cricket team that represents Kotli in the Kashmir Premier League. Khurram Manzoor was the captain and Mushtaq Ahmed was the coach of the team. Saeed Azad was originally Kotli Lions’ head coach but was replaced by Mushtaq Ahmed. Khurram Manzoor was announced as Kotli Lions’ icon player.

Squad

Season standings

Points table

League fixtures and results

Playoffs

Eliminator 1

Statistics

Most runs 

Source: Cricinfo

Most wickets 

Source: Cricinfo

References

Kashmir Premier League (Pakistan)